London '66–'67 is an EP and film of Pink Floyd music, containing two "lost" tracks—an extended version of "Interstellar Overdrive" and a previously unreleased track "Nick's Boogie". These tracks were originally recorded for Peter Whitehead's film Tonite Let's All Make Love in London in 1967, and the former appeared in edited form on the soundtrack album. Originally released in full on the 1990 See for Miles Records UK reissue of the soundtrack album, they were the earliest Pink Floyd recordings available commercially before the limited release of 1965: Their First Recordings in 2015.

The EP was originally issued in 1995, then reissued by Snapper Music (SMACD924X, 2005) on 13 September 2005, as a remastered CD and a DVD featuring the entire film plus excerpts from the original movie. The EP is considered an early example of the jazz fusion genre, incorporating jazz-influenced improvisation to their psychedelic compositions.

Track listing

DVD
London '66–'67, the original film with the full length video of "Interstellar Overdrive" and "Nick's Boogie".
Interview footage from the 1960s of Mick Jagger, David Hockney, Michael Caine and Julie Christie.
Footage capturing the London Scene in the late sixties.
Overview by director Peter Whitehead.

Personnel
Pink Floyd
Syd Barrett – electric guitar
Roger Waters – bass guitar
Richard Wright – Farfisa organ
Nick Mason – drums, percussion

Production
Joe Boyd – production
 John Wood – engineering

Certifications

References

1995 EPs
2005 films
Albums produced by Joe Boyd
Instrumental albums
Pink Floyd films
Pink Floyd soundtracks
Pink Floyd EPs
2000s British films